Sacha Grunpeter was a British actor best known for his portrayal of Michael in Agony Again and Didier Baptiste in Dream Team, where he went by the name of Tom Redhill. Shortly before his death, he also co-wrote, produced and portrayed Ethan in the film Tracing Cowboys.

References

External links 

1971 births
2005 deaths
20th-century English male actors
21st-century English male actors
English male television actors
English Jewish writers
Jewish English male actors
Road incident deaths in California